{{DISPLAYTITLE:C22H24N2O10}}
The molecular formula C22H24N2O10 (molar mass: 476.438 g/mol) may refer to:

 Aspergillusol A
 BAPTA, or 1,2-bis(o-aminophenoxy)ethane-N,N,N′,N′-tetraacetic acid

Molecular formulas